The Ahtna are an Alaska Native Athabaskan people of Alaska. 

Ahtna or Atna may also refer to:

Places
 Atna Range, a small sub-range of the Skeena Mountains in northern British Columbia, Canada
 Atna, Norway, a village in the municipality of Stor-Elvdal in Innlandet county, Norway
 Atna Peaks, an eroded shield volcano in the Wrangell Mountains of eastern Alaska
 Copper River (Alaska), also known as the Ahtna River
 Lake Atna, a proglacial lake that was in the Copper River Basin

Other
 Ahtna language, the indigenous language of the Ahtna people
 Ahtna, Incorporated, an Alaska Native Regional Corporation created under the Alaska Native Claims Settlement Act of 1971